The Echo Show is the second studio album by French band Yeti Lane, released on 5 March 2012.

Critical reception

Reviews for the album were mostly positive. MusicOMH was enthusiastic, saying "Each part of the duo brings their particular expertise  to the table, allowing them to collectively create something that is more often than not, rather magical... It's the duo’s capacity to work together and utilise their independent strengths for the good of the song that makes The Echo Show such a strong album. The balance between melody and chaos is in perfect equilibrium, creating a truly epic piece of work." Several reviewers noted the influence of Krautrock bands such as Kraftwerk and Neu!: Q described the record as "accentuating their irregular orbit between space Krautrock & 60s pop... The Echo Show sparkles with energy and verve", while Uncut said the album "offers Jean Michel Jarre meets Neu! '75 with everything turned up to 11. In the nicest possible way, it's monstrous". NME said "layers of bubbling synths build on top of krautrock-leaning rhythms and some otherworldly guitar sounds. The end result is stunning – like Grandaddy's The Sophtware Slump reimagined by Kraftwerk and Kevin Shields". Drowned in Sound noted the leap forward from the band's debut album, saying "there's an unerring tenacity about this record which suggests its real intention was to herald a new beginning. And more importantly, it succeeds on every level." BBC Music said "there's a seductively majestic quality always at play".

Track listing
All tracks written and composed by Yeti Lane.

 "Analog Wheel" – 7:56
 "The Echo Show" – 4:10
 "Warning Sensations" – 4:03
 - – 0:27
 "Logic Winds" – 4:01
 "Strange Call" – 3:21
 -- – 0:30
 "Alba" – 5:03
 --- – 1:37
 "Dead Tired" – 4:32
 "Sparkling Sunbeam" – 5:11
 "Faded Spectrum" – 6:48
 ---- – 1:04
The four tracks represented by dashes are untitled and consist of mostly instrumental pieces of music.

Personnel
Ben Pleng – vocals, guitars, bass, keyboards, programming
Charlie B – drums, keyboards, programming
David-Ivar Herman Dune – vocals on "Sparkling Sunbeam"
Jane Mosconi – backing vocals on "Alba"
Barbara Silverstone – backing vocals on "Alba"

References

2012 albums